Aguaje Canyon is a canyon stream in Las Animas County, Colorado, United States. A spring, or aguaje, is found at its head from which flows as a tributary stream into the Chacuaco Creek at its canyon mouth, in Chacuaco Canyon, which is a tributary of the Purgatoire River.

References

Canyons and gorges of Colorado
Rivers of Las Animas County, Colorado